Vladimir Boljević (born 17 January 1988, in Titograd) is a Montenegrin footballer.

Playing career

Club
In February 2011, he moved to Polish club Cracovia, from his home club FK Zeta .
Now he plays for FK Iskra Danilovgrad.

International
He was a part of Montenegro national under-21 football team. He made his senior debut for Montenegro in a June 2015 friendly match against Denmark national football team and earned a total of 8 caps, scoring no goals. His final international was a March 2016 friendly against Greece.

Honours
Cypriot Cup:
Winner: 2017–18

References

External links

 
 Profile at WikiPasy.pl  

1988 births
Living people
Footballers from Podgorica
Association football wingers
Montenegrin footballers
Montenegro under-21 international footballers
Montenegro international footballers
Ekstraklasa players
Cypriot First Division players
FK Zeta players
MKS Cracovia (football) players
AEK Larnaca FC players
Doxa Katokopias FC players
Montenegrin First League players
I liga players
Montenegrin expatriate footballers
Expatriate footballers in Poland
Montenegrin expatriate sportspeople in Poland
Expatriate footballers in Cyprus
Montenegrin expatriate sportspeople in Cyprus